Vladimirovo is a rural locality (a village) in Vakhnevskoye Rural Settlement, Nikolsky District, Vologda Oblast, Russia. The population was 37 as of 2002.

Geography 
Vladimirovo is located 48 km northwest of Nikolsk (the district's administrative centre) by road. Polovina is the nearest rural locality.

References 

Rural localities in Nikolsky District, Vologda Oblast